Krishnamurthy Institute of Algology (KIA) is a Chennai-based institute founded by algologist Prof. V. Krishnamurthy. KIA is involved in providing lifetime achievement awards in algology to algologists from India.

The institute's library, which is public, has collections of books, journals, and articles related to algology. The facility also has a semi-annual journal, Indian Hydrobiology.

References

Universities and colleges in Chennai